CKOC (1150 AM) is a radio station in Hamilton, Ontario. Owned by Bell Media, it broadcasts a business news format. CKOC is a 50,000-watt, Class B station operating on a Regional (not clear-channel) broadcast frequency, with transmitters located near Empire Corners in Haldimand County, about 25 kilometers (15 miles) south of Hamilton. A six-tower directional antenna is used at all times. CKOC's studios are located on Upper Wentworth Street (next to Lime Ridge Mall) in Hamilton.

History

Early history 
CKOC has the distinction of being the oldest continuously-operating radio station in Canada, on the air since May 1, 1922. Station CHAB, in Moose Jaw, Saskatchewan, began broadcasting a week earlier, on April 23, 1922, and is still on the air today, but was shut down for a period of time in 1933 before re-opening.  As well, CFCF, later CINW, Montreal, had traced its sign on to 1919, but ceased operations in 2010.

Originally, CKOC's station was based in the Lower City at the corner of King William and John Streets, and was an offshoot of the Wentworth Radio and Supply Company. In the spring of 1922, the station became the third radio station in all of Canada. Other broadcast locations over the years for CKOC include, the 11th floor of the Royal Connaught Hotel in the downtown core, the Lister Block building on James & King Williams Streets, and a studio on Garfield Avenue near King & Sherman Avenue North in a building that once housed the Garfield exchange switching equipment of the Bell Telephone Company.
During its early years, the station broadcast on a number of frequencies, including 880, 630 and 1120 kHz; the station moved to its current frequency of 1150 in 1941.

CKOC became a CBC affiliate in 1936 and would be an affiliate of the CBC's Trans-Canada Network until 1962.

Later history: CHR and Oldies formats
CKOC featured a Top 40/CHR format from 1960 to 1992, and increased its power to 50,000 watts in 1979.

On February 17, 1992, after a countdown of the Top 500 hits of all time (a long-running annual tradition at the station), CKOC debuted "Oldies 1150" with the new calls CKMO ("More Oldies"). However, on April 2, 1993, the station reverted to the heritage CKOC calls, admitting that dropping the calls in the first place had been a mistake and that the station's listeners wanted the original calls back. The station mentioned its Top 40 heritage on the air as part of the current oldies format, with liners such as, "The station that played 'em then... plays 'em again." The "Good Times, Great Oldies" branding started sometime in late 2006.

From 1928 to 1955, the call letters CKMO were used at a pioneer radio station in Vancouver. From 1993 to 2012, the CKMO call sign was again used at a radio station in Victoria, British Columbia. In 2014, the CKMO call letters moved to a radio station in Orangeville as CKMO-FM.

CKOC first applied for an FM station in 1968, but the FM station did not take to the air until 1986 as adult contemporary station CKLH-FM.

CKOC has suffered from much co-channel interference from CJRC in Gatineau, Quebec at night, particularly in Southwestern Ontario and north of Toronto which received a relatively clear signal for CKOC during the day. In these areas, CKOC was almost impossible to pick up on some nights due to CJRC. This interference was remedied in Spring 2007, when CJRC moved to the FM dial and closed the AM signal.

On October 28, 2007, CKOC was purchased by Astral Media as part of its purchase of Standard Broadcasting.

In 2012, CKOC, known as one of "Canada's Oldest radio stations", turned 90 years old.

In mid-June 2013, after CING-FM switched formats from Classic Hits to hot AC, CKOC added more 1970s' and 1980s' music to its playlist. It was the first time since February 1992, when the station changed its format, that any music later than the 1970s has been played on the station, a trend mirroring most other oldies outlets in North America, which have moved away from the oldies positioning and have adopted classic hits approaches. The station dropped the "Great Oldies" reference and referred to itself as "Classic Hits 1150 CKOC".

On June 27, 2013, Astral Media was absorbed by Bell Media, making CKOC a Bell owned-and-operated station.

On November 4, 2014, the CRTC approved an application by Bell Media to modify CKOC's facilities from a five-tower day pattern and a ten-tower night pattern with a transmitter power of 50,000 watts to a six-tower operation with a daytime transmitter power of 50,000 watts and a night-time transmitter power of 20,000 watts.

TSN Radio 1150

On May 28, 2015, Bell Media announced that CKOC would flip to sports talk later that fall, joining the TSN Radio network as TSN Radio 1150. As part of a new agreement, the station became the home station for the CFL's Hamilton Tiger-Cats, and the Hamilton affiliate for the Toronto Raptors and Toronto Maple Leafs; the station also later acquired the rights to McMaster Marauders football. This move also made the station Hamilton's first-ever all-sports station.
 On September 2, CKOC announced they will flip to the format on Labour Day, September 7, in conjunction with the Tiger-Cats vs. Argonauts Labour Day Classic. CKOC ended its classic hits format with The Last Big 500 Countdown of the top classic hits during the Labour Day weekend before the launch of the sports format at 10 a.m. on September 7. The #1 song in the countdown, and the last song played on CKOC, was "Satisfaction" by The Rolling Stones.

The station carried three local programs, Ticats at Noon, Game Day and Tatti & Marsh. The remainder of its programming was filled by simulcasts from sister station CHUM, and Fox Sports Radio. Initial ratings for TSN Radio in Hamilton were extremely poor, as CKOC's market share dropped from 2.9% to 0.3%.  With approximately 5,900 listeners a week, CKOC is now the lowest-rated station in the Hamilton market.

In 2016, CKOC acquired rights to Hamilton Bulldogs hockey. On April 3, 2018, CKOC began broadcasting Sunday Night's Main Event, a professional wrestling talk show hosted by Jason Agnew (former host of the similar program Live Audio Wrestling).

BNN Bloomberg Radio
On February 9, 2021, Bell Media ended the TSN Radio formats at CKOC, CFRW in Winnipeg and CKST in Vancouver. CKOC then flipped to BNN Bloomberg Radio, a business news format featuring programming from Bloomberg Radio and Bell Media's BNN Bloomberg television channel. The format originated from CFTE in Vancouver. Subsequently, the Tiger-Cats announced that they would pursue a new radio home.

References

External links
 
 CKOC 1150 Charts Site | CKOC1150Archives.com
 
 
 Radio-locator information on CKOC

Radio stations established in 1922
Koc
Business talk radio stations
Koc
Koc
Bloomberg L.P.
1922 establishments in Ontario